The 1947 Los Angeles Rams season was the team's tenth year with the National Football League and the second season in Los Angeles.

Before the season

Draft

Schedule

Standings

References

Los Angeles Rams
Los Angeles Rams seasons
Los Angeles